Truth in 24 II: Every Second Counts is a 2012 documentary film detailing Audi's preparation for the 2011 24 Hours of Le Mans. The film is based on the documentary Truth in 24 which detailed Audi's preparation for the 2008 24 Hours of Le Mans.

British action film actor Jason Statham is the film's narrator. Numerous Audi officials and drivers are interviewed through the film, including the eventual winning team of Marcel Fässler, André Lotterer, and Benoît Tréluyer.

Release
Truth in 24 II: Every Second Counts premiered on-on air on SpeedTV on May 5, 2012. The film was also released for free download on iTunes.

References

External links

2012 films
Documentary films about auto racing
24 Hours of Le Mans
American sports documentary films
American auto racing films
2010s English-language films
2010s American films